Major-General Abdul Rahman Alhaji Mamudu (1937 - 1992) was military Governor of Gongola State, Nigeria between July 1978 and October 1979 during the military regime of General Olusegun Obasanjo. He was an alumnus of the National Institute of Policy and Strategic Studies.

During the period immediately after the coup that brought General Yakubu Gowon to power in July 1966, many thousands of Igbos were slaughtered throughout the North, including civilians and army personnel.

Mamudu was one of the few Southern officers to advise his Eastern soldiers to stop showing up for work for their own safety, allowing them to escape to Biafra.

Much later, Mamudu became governor of Gongola State and a Commander of the Nigerian Army Signals Corps.
 
After he retired from Military service, he went into private enterprise as a stevedore with the Nigerian Ports Authority (NPA).
He was married to Rukayat Mamudu and they had five children.

References

1937 births
1992 deaths
Governors of Gongola State
Nigerian Muslims
Nigerian generals